The Formation of the Economic Thought of Karl Marx: 1843 to Capital is a 1967 book by the Marxist theorist Ernest Mandel, in which the author discusses the economic theories of Karl Marx. It appeared in English translation in 1971.

Reception
The Formation of the Economic Thought of Karl Marx received a positive review in Telos from James E. Hansen when the work was published in English in 1971. Hansen welcomed Mandel's book as important contribution to scholarship on Marx. The political scientist David McLellan called Mandel's work "excellent". McLellan recommended the book, together with Mandel's An Introduction to Marxist Economic Theory, as the best introduction to Marx's economics.

See also
 Capital: Critique of Political Economy

References

1967 non-fiction books
French non-fiction books
Books about Marxism